A duopoly (from Greek δύο, duo "two" and πωλεῖν, polein "to sell") is a type of oligopoly where two firms have dominant or exclusive control over a market. It is the most commonly studied form of oligopoly due to its simplicity. Duopolies sell to consumers in a competitive market where the choice of an individual consumer can not affect the firm. The defining characteristic of both duopolies and oligopolies is that decisions made by sellers are dependent on each other.

Duopoly models in economics and game theory
There are two principal duopoly models, Cournot duopoly and Bertrand duopoly:
 The Cournot model, which shows that two firms assume each other's output and treat this as a fixed amount, and produce in their own firm according to this. 
 Cournot Model in Game Theory: In 1838, Antoine A. Cournot published a book titled "Researches Into the Mathematical Principles  of the Theory of Wealth" in which he introduced and developed this model for the first time. As an  imperfect competition model, Cournot duopoly (also known as Cournot competition), in which two  firms with identical cost functions compete with homogenous products in a static context, is also  known as Cournot competition. In this model, three companies, each of which chooses its own  quantity of output, compete against each other while facing constant marginal and average costs.  The market price is determined by the sum of the output of two companies.  is the  equation for the market demand function. Cournot's duopoly marked the beginning  of the study of oligopolies, and specifically duopolies, as well as the expansion of the research of  market structures, which had previously focussed on the extremes of perfect competition and  monopoly. The general process for obtaining a Nash equilibrium of a game using the best response  functions is followed in order to discover a Nash equilibrium of Cournot's model for a specific cost  function and demand function.
The Bertrand model, in which, in a game of two firms, each one of them will assume that the other will not change prices in response to its price cuts. When both firms use this logic, they will reach a Nash equilibrium
Bertrand Model in Game Theory  The Bertrand Competition was developed by French mathematician called Joseph Louis François  Bertrand after investigating the claims of the Cournot model in “Researches into the mathematical  principles of the theory of wealth, 1838”. According to the Cournot model, firms  in a duopoly would be able to keep prices above marginal cost and hence be extremely profitable. Bertrand took issue with this. In this market structure, each firm could only choose whole amounts  and each firm receives zero payoff when the aggregate demand exceeds the size of amount that they  share with each other.

Characteristics of duopoly 
 Existence of only two sellers.
 Interdependence: the action of each firm influences the demand faced by their rival.
 Presence of monopoly elements: as long as products are differentiated, the firms enjoy some monopoly power, as each product will have some loyal customers.

Quality standards 
A low-quality manufacturer benefits from a slightly stringent quality standard in the absence of sunk costs, whereas a high-quality producer suffers from it. Consumer welfare improves if the firm generating the higher quality does not considerably enhance its quality in response to its competitor's increase in quality. Exit from the industry is triggered by a sufficiently strict requirement. The high-quality producer exits first when there are no sunk costs.

Politics

Like a market, a political system can be dominated by two groups, which exclude other parties or ideologies from participation. One party or the other tends to dominate government at any given time (the Majority party), while the other has only limited power (the Minority party). According to Duverger's law, this tends to be caused by a simple winner-take-all voting system without runoffs or ranked choices. The United States and many Latin American countries, such as Costa Rica, Guyana, and the Dominican Republic have two-party government systems.

Duopoly in Danish court politics

The prime minister-finance minister duopoly is an unusual form of court politics. There have been few other countries where the prime minister and the Treasury have had such a tumultuous relationship as Australia and the United Kingdom. There have been some confrontations in the past when the Finance ministry did not have the full support of the prime minister, leading to internal ministerial battles over economic strategy.

A permanent civil service is a basic requirement for the duopoly system to function properly. The permanent civil service in general, and the Socialist Party in particular, are critical to the duopoly's effective operation. The conventional inter-governmental duopoly is carried by civil servants.

The duopoly is confronted with some quandaries, such as tentions between different groups in the office over their relative positions. Departmental budget cuts are being made across the board.

The prime ministerial-finance-ministry duopoly requires more credibility. Trust is a rare commodity among Australians and Britons. Denmark has a lot to offer. The Danish duopoly works together. Australia and the United Kingdom have competitive duopolies, and competitive duopolies are unstable.

Examples in business

A commonly cited example of a duopoly is that involving Visa and Mastercard, who between them control a large proportion of the electronic payment processing market. In 2000 they were the defendants in a United States Department of Justice antitrust lawsuit. An appeal was upheld in 2004.

Examples where two companies control an overwhelming proportion of a market are:

 Airbus and Boeing in the largest commercial aircraft market in the world
 Nvidia and AMD in the GPU market
 Intel and AMD in the desktop CPU market
 Google's Android and Apple's iOS make up over 99% of the mobile operating system market
 Google and Meta together make up the majority of the online advertisement market.
 The Coca-Cola Company and PepsiCo in the soft drink market, resulting in the cola wars. The two companies control nearly all of the cola beverage market.
 DC Comics and Marvel Comics in the American comic book market
 Woolworths and Coles in the Australian supermarket market
 Myer and David Jones in the Australian upmarket department store market
 Husqvarna and Stihl in the chainsaw market
 Doppelmayr Garaventa Group and HTI Group consisting of Poma & Leitner in the market for ropeways, transport commonly used in mountainous regions, ski resorts, cities and amusement parks.
 Norfolk Southern and CSX operate a duopoly on freight rail traffic in the Eastern United States, and Union Pacific and BNSF operate a duopoly on freight rail traffic elsewhere in the United States.

Media
In Finland, the state-owned broadcasting company Yleisradio and the private broadcaster Mainos-TV had a legal duopoly (in the economists' sense of the word) from the 1950s to 1993. No other broadcasters were allowed. Mainos-TV operated by leasing air time from Yleisradio, broadcasting in reserved blocks between Yleisradio's own programming on its two channels. This was a unique phenomenon in the world. Between 1986 and 1992 there was an independent third channel but it was jointly owned by Yle and M-TV; only in 1993 did M-TV get its own channel.

In the United Kingdom, the BBC and ITV formed an effective duopoly (with Channel 4 originally being economically dependent on ITV) until the development of multichannel from the 1990s onwards.

In Africa, mobile service providers Safaricom and Airtel in Kenya are examples of a Duopoly market in the telecommunication industry.

Broadcasting

Duopoly is also used in the United States broadcast television and radio industry to refer to a single company owning two outlets in the same city.

This usage is technically incompatible with the normal definition of the word and may lead to confusion, inasmuch as there are generally more than two owners of broadcast television stations in markets with broadcast duopolies. In Canada, this definition is therefore more commonly called a "twinstick".

See also

 Monopoly
 Oligopoly
 Two-party system

References

Market structure
Oligopoly